In botany, the petiole is the stalk that attaches the leaf blade to the stem, and is able to twist the leaf to face the sun. This gives a characteristic foliage arrangement to the plant. Outgrowths appearing on each side of the petiole in some species are called stipules. The terms petiolate and apetiolate are applied respectively to leaves with and without petioles.

Description

The petiole is a stalk that attaches a leaf to the plant stem. In petiolate leaves the leaf stalk may be long (as in the leaves of celery and rhubarb), or short (for example basil). When completely absent, the blade attaches directly to the stem and is said to be sessile. Subpetiolate leaves have an extremely short petiole, and may appear sessile. The broomrape family Orobanchaceae is an example of a family in which the leaves are always sessile. In some other plant groups, such as the speedwell genus Veronica, petiolate and sessile leaves may occur in different species.

In the grasses (Poaceae), the leaves are apetiolate, but the leaf blade may be narrowed at the junction with the leaf sheath to form a pseudopetiole, as in Pseudosasa japonica.

In plants with compound leaves, the leaflets are attached to a continuation of the petiole called the rachis. Each leaflet may be attached to the rachis by a short stalk called the petiolule. There may be swollen regions at either end of the petiole known as pulvina (singular = pulvinus) that are composed of a flexible tissue that allows leaf movement. Pulvina are common in the bean family Fabaceae and the prayer plant family Marantaceae. A pulvinus on a petiolule is called a pulvinulus. 

In some plants, the petioles are flattened and widened to become phyllodes (also known as phyllodia or cladophylls) and the true leaves may be reduced or absent. Thus, the phyllode comes to serve the functions of the leaf. Phyllodes are common in the genus Acacia, especially the Australian species, at one time put in Acacia subgenus Phyllodineae.

In Acacia koa, the phyllodes are leathery and thick, allowing the tree to survive stressful environments. The petiole allows partially submerged hydrophytes to have leaves floating at different depths, the petiole being between the node and the stem.

In plants such as rhubarb (Rheum rhabarbarum), celery (Apium graveolens), artichokes, and cardoons (Cynara cardunculus), the petioles ("stalks" or "ribs") are cultivated as edible crops. The petiole of rhubarb grows directly from the rhizome and produces the leaf at its end. Botanically, it is categorized as a vegetable but, culinarily, it is more often used as a fruit.

Longest

Etymology
Petiole comes from Latin petiolus, or peciolus "little foot", "stem", an alternative diminutive of pes "foot". The regular diminutive pediculus is also used for "foot stalk".

See also
Hyponastic response
Pedicel

References

External links

Plant morphology

de:Blatt (Pflanze)#Blattstiel
he:פטוטרת
fi:Lehtiruoti